Dennis Tueart (born 27 November 1949) is an English former footballer who played for Sunderland, Manchester City, Stoke City and Burnley at club level. On the international scene, he won six full caps for England.

Career
Tueart was born in Newcastle upon Tyne and began his career with Sunderland. Following their relegation in 1969–70 the Wearsiders tried in vain to gain a quick return to the First Division but found success in the FA Cup winning the competition in 1973 by beating Leeds United 1–0. In March 1974 Tueart signed for Manchester City and was part of the winning team in the 1976 League Cup final, memorable for him scoring with a spectacular overhead kick. He scored 73 goals in 173 matches for Man City.

He moved to the United States to join the New York Cosmos, where he not only won Soccer Bowl '78, but was named man of the match for netting two goals in the Cosmos' 3–1 victory over Tampa Bay. Tueart remained with New York until 1980.

He re-signed for Manchester City in February 1980. He spent four years back at Maine Road, playing in the 1981 FA Cup Final, until the club was relegated in 1982–83. He joined Stoke City in August 1983 in time for the start of the 1983–84 season, but now into his mid-thirties Tueart struggled to force his way into the starting line up at the Victoria Ground and after making just four appearances by December he left for Burnley. He saw out the remainder of the 1983–84 season with the Clarets and later played for Irish club Derry City.

Post-retirement
Tueart later became a director of Manchester City, where he was heavily involved in the appointments of managers Joe Royle and Kevin Keegan. In July 2007, following the takeover of Manchester City by Thaksin Shinawatra, Tueart was sacked as a director, ending a 33-year association as a player and director with the club. In a competition where more than 20,000 supporters cast their votes on the 50 golden moments as nominated on The Football League's special 50th anniversary website, Dennis Tueart's winning goal against Newcastle United for Manchester City in the 1976 League Cup Final was voted the greatest moment in the competition's history.

Outside of football, Tueart is a director of conferencing business Premier Events.

Personal life
Tueart has three sons with his wife Joan. His autobiography, titled My Football Journey, described how he lost multiple members of his family to cancer, with Tueart donating the royalties from his book to The Christie cancer hospital.

Career statistics

Club
Source:

A.  The "Other" column constitutes appearances and goals in the Anglo-Italian Cup, Anglo-Scottish Cup, Texaco Cup and Full Members Cup.

International
Source:

Honours

Club
Sunderland
 FA Cup: 1972-73

Manchester City
 League Cup: 1975-76
 FA Cup runner-up: 1980-81

New York Cosmos
 NASL: 1978, 1979
 Soccer Bowl: 1978

Individual
PFA Division Two Team of the Year: 1973-74

References

1949 births
Living people
English footballers
Burnley F.C. players
Manchester City F.C. players
Stoke City F.C. players
Sunderland A.F.C. players
North American Soccer League (1968–1984) players
New York Cosmos players
England international footballers
England under-23 international footballers
Derry City F.C. players
League of Ireland players
English Football League players
English Football League representative players
Association football forwards
English expatriate sportspeople in the United States
Expatriate soccer players in the United States
English expatriate footballers
FA Cup Final players